Marvin O'Connor (born 18 April 1991) is a French rugby union player of Australian descent. Originally a half-back, his current position is wing and he now plays for the French Top 14 club Stade Francais. 

O'Connor started playing at the age of 5 with Annemasse rugby club (Haute Savoie) before moving to Grenoble at the age of 16. He made his first appearance with the senior professional team FC Grenoble in the Pro D2 in 2010 when still only 18 before moving to Bayonne in 2011.

Honours
 2015–16 European Rugby Challenge Cup : winner (Montpellier).

References

1991 births
Living people
French rugby union players
Aviron Bayonnais players
Rugby union wings
People from Annemasse
Sportspeople from Haute-Savoie